Strathclyde Sirens are a Scottish netball team based in Glasgow. Since 2017 their senior team has played in the Netball Superleague. Sirens also played in the 2018 Netball New Zealand Super Club tournament. They were originally known as the Scottish Sirens. In 2017 they became the UWS Sirens as a result of a sponsorship arrangement with the University of the West of Scotland. In 2018 they became the University of Strathclyde Sirens, usually shortened to   Strathclyde Sirens, after forming a partnership with the University of Strathclyde.  
Sirens other main partners include Netball Scotland and the Scotland national netball team.

History

Scottish Sirens
In June 2016 it was announced that Scottish Sirens, together with Severn Stars and Wasps Netball, would be one of three new franchises that would join the Netball Superleague for the 2017 season. Scottish Sirens were originally formed as a partnership between Netball Scotland and the University of the West of Scotland. On 21 February 2017, with a team coached by Gail Parata and including Claire Brownie, Caroline O'Hanlon and Carla Borrego, Sirens made their Superleague debut at the Emirates Arena in a 43–57 defeat against fellow newcomers Wasps.

UWS Sirens
In September 2017 it was announced that the University of the West of Scotland would sponsor Sirens for the 2018 season. As a result the team became known as UWS Sirens. As UWS Sirens, they also played in the 2018 Netball New Zealand Super Club tournament, finishing fifth overall.

Strathclyde Sirens
In October 2018, it was announced that Sirens would be renamed the University of Strathclyde Sirens after agreeing a partnership deal with the University of Strathclyde.

Scotland
Sirens work in partnership with both Netball Scotland and the Scotland national netball team. Gail Parata served as the joint head coach of both Sirens and Scotland. At the 2019 Netball World Cup, eleven of the Scotland squad were Sirens players.

Home venue
Sirens play their home games at the Emirates Arena.

Notable players

2023 Squad

Internationals

 Sara Bayman
 Leah Kennedy

 Nicole Aiken-Pinnock
 Carla Borrego

 Cathrine Latu
 Ellen Halpenny

 Caroline O'Hanlon

 Zanele Vimbela

 Cathrine Latu

Head coaches

References

External links
  Strathclyde Sirens on Facebook
  Strathclyde Sirens on Twitter

Netball Superleague teams
Netball teams in Scotland
2016 establishments in Scotland
Sports clubs established in 2016
Scotland national netball team
Sirens
Sports teams in Glasgow